Mamakan may refer to:
 Mamakan, Silvaneh
 Mamakan, Sumay-ye Beradust
 Mamakan, Russia
 Mamakan (river), a tributary of the Vitim in Russia